This is a list of actors who have performed at the Royal National Theatre, which is based in London, England.

 Peggy Ashcroft
 Eileen Atkins
 Tom Baker
 Simon Russell Beale
 Caroline Blakiston
 Michael Brandon
 Jeremy Brett
 Jim Broadbent
 Dora Bryan
 Michael Bryant
 Anna Calder-Marshall
 Simon Callow
 Michael Cashman
 John Challis
 Ian Charleson
 David Collings
 Rowena Cooper
 Brian Cox
 Felicity Dean
 Judi Dench
 Olympia Dukakis
 Christopher Eccleston
 Lynn Farleigh
 Albert Finney
 Ann Firbank
 Michael Gambon
 John Gielgud
 Julian Glover
 Adam Godley
 Sheila Hancock
 Nigel Havers
 Ian Holm
 Anthony Hopkins
 Bernard Horsfall
 Derek Jacobi
 Louise Jameson
 Martin Jarvis
 Caroline John
 Dinsdale Landen
 Adrian Lester
 Nigel Lindsay
 Maureen Lipman
 Helen McCrory
 Phelim McDermott
 Ian McKellen
 Mark McManus
 Lesley Manville
 Helen Mirren
 John Normington
 Tracy Ann Oberman
 Laurence Olivier
 Trevor Peacock
 Ronald Pickup
 Joan Plowright
 Christopher Plummer
 Tim Preece
 Corin Redgrave
 Vanessa Redgrave
 Alan Rickman
 Diana Rigg
 Paul Scofield
 John Shrapnel
 Lee Simpson
 Maggie Smith
 Robert Stephens
 John Stride
 Catherine Tate
 David Tennant
 Christopher Timothy
 Benjamin Whitrow
 Jodie Whittaker
 John Wood
 Adam Woodyatt

References

See also

 List of people from London
 List of British actors

Lists of theatre actors
Royal
Lists of people from London